Firmin Pauloin (14 January 1876 – 7 August 1940) was a French racing cyclist. He rode in the 1920 Tour de France.

References

1876 births
1940 deaths
French male cyclists
Place of birth missing